Oldham Hulme Grammar School, formerly Hulme Grammar School, is a private grammar school in Oldham, Greater Manchester, England.

History
Oldham Grammar School was founded in 1611 by several charitable individuals including Laurence Chadeton, but closed in 1866 and was refounded, under the Endowed Schools Act 1869 (hence the claim to be a continuation of this earlier school is debated). The doorway of the original Oldham Grammar School building with its date stone and a window were incorporated into the current school building in the 1920s. When the school was refounded in 1887 it obtained some money from a charitable trust created in 1691 by a bequest from William Hulme, after whom the new school was named. The main buildings, incorporating were erected in 1895 by the Hulme Trust. The first headmaster of the new era was Samuel Ogden Andrew, who later achieved acclaim as a translator of Homer.

The school was a direct grant grammar school from 1946 until 1976. It reverted to independence with the phasing-out of the Direct Grant scheme, and is now a private school which selects its students by examination and interview. Fees are in the region of £10 000 a year.

Features
The Principal of the Hulme Grammar Schools is Mr. Antony Oulton.  Previously the boys' and girls' schools had separate heads. The boys' head, Mr Kenneth Jones, retired in 2006 which resulted in the executive decision by the governors to appoint a new head of both schools. Dr Paul Neeson was appointed as the first principal of the Oldham Hulme Grammar Schools.

Boys and girls are taught separately from the ages of 11 to 16, but there is a joint sixth form. The combined number of pupils is around 770.

There are coeducational junior schools for pupils aged 7 to 11 - "Hulme Court" for the year 3 and 4, and "Estcourt" for the year 5 and 6. There are also mixed nursery and infants classes hosted at 'Thorneycroft'.

In recent years the number of admissions to the school has been reduced. Thus up to the mid-1990s the school was admitting 120 boys per year; in recent years the number admitted has been in the 90s, though in 2009, 120 were admitted.

Notable alumni

See also
 William Hulme
 Hulme Trust
 William Hulme's Grammar School
 :Category:People educated at Oldham Hulme Grammar School

References

External links
 Hulme Grammar School

Private schools in the Metropolitan Borough of Oldham
Member schools of the Headmasters' and Headmistresses' Conference
Schools in Oldham
Diamond schools
Hulme Trust